RMZ Corp is a privately owned real estate firm in India, headquartered in Bangalore. The company was established in 2002. RMZ Corp is India's largest LEED certified company according to The Hindu Business Line. LEED is one of the most popular green building certification programs used worldwide.

History
Arjun Menda completed his master's in technology from IIT Kharagpur and went to work with companies like Mahindra & Mahindra, and Gabriel India Limited. He ventured into the real estate business in 1980. With years of his experience, he founded RMZ Corp Holdings Private Limited in 2002.

His sons, Raj Menda & Manoj Menda, in 2002, along with the father, went on to start RMZ’s first project in Bengaluru.

In 2012, RMZ Corp entered the residential real estate sector with projects like Latitude, Saawan, and Galleria. Sovereign wealth fund, Qatar Investment Authority (QIA) invested $300 million in RMZ Corp in 2013 for a stake of 21%. RMZ Corp raised $500 million in the second round of funding in 2016. In the same year, the company also acquired an 800,000 sq ft IT park in Gurugram from real estate company BPTP for about Rs 850 crore.

In 2018, RMZ Corp struck a nearly $1 billion deal to buy back shares from Qatar Investment Authority (QIA). RMZ Foundation began its new initiative “Road to Zero Wastage”. RMZ Corp's tech parks, Ecoworld and Infinity managed to reduce the percentage of mixed, or unsegregated waste to about 15% from 50%.

In 2019, RMZ Corp and DB Realty bought the iconic film studio Kamalistan, located on the Jogeshwari-Vikhroli Link Road in Mumbai.

In 2020, RMZ Corp sold assets worth $2 billion to Brookfield, India’s biggest property deal. In the same year, RMZ Corp joined Well Living Lab Alliance, a global consortium of organizations.

RMZ Corp became the first company globally to achieve The WELL HEALTH-SAFETY RATING for supporting the health and safety of people in the fight against COVID-19.

Corporate social responsibility
RMZ Foundation is a non-profit organization established in 2015. Anu Menda is the managing trustee of the foundation. The foundation also supports many educational institutions and conducts free workshops for students. Through their Social Housing initiative, they build homes for economically disadvantaged families. The foundation also runs a Social Impact Hub, where they are creating a tech-enabled ecosystem to address social issues. At their Urban Innovation Hub,  they incubate and encourage innovations that will help transform cities and communities.

Waste Management
A founding member of the Indian Green Building Council, RMZ has led the movement in zero waste tech parks and other sustainability initiatives in India. Partnering with social enterprise Saahas Zero Waste, the company has been able to reduce its percentage of mixed, or unsegregated, waste to about 15% from 50%.

Awards
LEED Arc Gold Certificate for the year 2008 and 2009
Hurun Real Estate Leadership Summit and Excellence Award for the years 2017 & 2018
LEED Gold Certified 2018
RMZ Ecoworld wins the '2020 ULI Asia Pacific Awards" for Excellence

References

Real estate companies established in 2002
Indian companies established in 2002
Real estate companies of India